Juan Guerra may refer to:

Juan Guerra (footballer, born 1987), Venezuelan footballer
Juan Luis Guerra (born 1957), Dominican popular singer
Juan Nepomuceno Guerra (1915–2001), Mexican organized crime figure
Juan Nicasio Guerra (born 1954), Mexican politician
Juan Guerra (footballer, born 1927), Bolivian footballer
Juan Carlos Guerra Zunzunegui, Spanish politician
Juan Luis Guerra, Dominican musician
Juan Guerra (footballer, born 1991), Spanish footballer

Places 
Juan Guerra District, in the Peruvian province of San Martín

Guerra, Juan